Kanakanahalli Ramachandra (18 August 1933 – 17 January 2011) was an Indian mathematician working in both analytic number theory and algebraic number theory.

Early career
After his father's death at age 13, he had to look for a job. Ramachandra worked as a clerk at the Minerva Mills where Ramachandra's father had also worked. In spite of taking up a job quite remote from mathematics, Ramachandra studied number theory all by himself in his free time; especially the works of Ramanujan.

Ramachandra completed his graduation and post graduation from Central College, Bangalore.

Later, he worked as a lecturer in BMS College of Engineering. Ramachandra also served a very short stint of only six days as a teacher in the Indian Institute of Science, Bangalore.

Ramachandra went to the Tata Institute of Fundamental Research (TIFR), Bombay, for his graduate studies in 1958. He obtained his PhD from University of Mumbai in 1965; his doctorate was guided by K. G. Ramanathan.

Later career
Between the years 1965 and 1995 he worked at the Tata Institute of Fundamental Research and after retirement joined the National Institute of Advanced Studies, Bangalore where he worked till 2011, the year he died. During the course of his lifetime, he published over 200 articles, of which over 170 have been catalogued by Mathematical Reviews.

His work was primarily in the area of prime number theory, working on the Riemann zeta function and allied functions. Apart from prime number theory, he made substantial contributions to the theory of transcendental number theory, in which he is known for his proof of the six exponentials theorem, achieved independently of Serge Lang. He also contributed to many other areas of number theory.

In 1978 he founded the Hardy–Ramanujan journal, and published it on behalf of the Hardy–Ramanujan society until his death.

Awards and distinctions
Elected President of the Calcutta Mathematical Society for the period; 2007–2010
Elected Vice-President of the Calcutta Mathematical Society for the period; 2000–2003
Meghnad Saha Award, UGC, Hari Om Trust (1976)
Srinivasa Ramanujan Birth Centenary Award ISCA ; 1994–1995
Srinivasa Ramanujan Medal; 1997.
Sir.M.Vishveshwaraya Award of KSCST; 1997
Editor of Hardy-Ramanujan Journal

Publications

References

External links

Kanakanahalli Ramachandra

People from Mandya
20th-century Indian mathematicians
21st-century Indian mathematicians
1933 births
2011 deaths
Scientists from Karnataka
Indian number theorists